Deliverance is an American Christian thrash metal band which later shifted more towards heavy metal and progressive metal. Founded by Jimmy P. Brown II in 1985, many members have either stayed in the lineup for a number of years, or left and returned to the lineup. Jimmy P. Brown II has been the only constant member of Deliverance.

History

Early career and rise to near fame (1985–1991)
Deliverance formed in 1985 as a speed metal outfit. The band's song "A Space Called You" appeared on the 1987 compilation album California Metal. Deliverance, the band's self-titled debut album, was released in 1989 with Jimmy P. Brown II (guitars and lead vocals), Glenn Rogers (lead guitar), Brian Khairullah (bass), and Chris Hyde (drums). In 1989, Deliverance's track "If You Will" appeared on the Hot Metal Summer II compilation album along with a recorded interview.

Deliverance garnered significant attention in the Christian metal community with their second studio album, Weapons of Our Warfare, in 1990. During this time, the band replaced guitarist Glenn Rogers with George Ochoa. Deliverance released a music video on MTV for the title track of Weapons of Our Warfare. The song was also included on the Intense Records compilation album Hot Metal Summer III Hot Licks - Cold Facts.

During the production of their third studio album, What a Joke, Brian Khairullah and Chris Hyde were replaced with Mike Grato and Kevin Lee respectively. The album did not perform as well, and tensions within the band resulted in the departure of George Ochoa.

Four more albums and first breakup (1992–1996)
Their fourth studio album was a major change in direction for the band musically. Stay of Execution went in a more progressive metal direction, complete with new guitarist Mike Phillips.

In an interview with Doug Van Pelt of HM Magazine, when asked about the musical change, Jimmy P. Brown explained:

While this move did anger fans at the time, others feel that Stay represents Deliverance's best work. Their fifth album, Learn, continued in a progressive direction with new bassist Manny Morales and lead guitarist Jonathan Maddux. From this time on, the other positions in the band changed with increasing frequency, but the core of the band remained Jimmy Brown and Manny Morales.

Deliverance released River Distrurbance in 1994 and Camelot in Smithereens in 1995. Camelot was the poorest seller in the Deliverance catalog at the time.

Reunion and second hiatus (2000–2010)
After a four-year hiatus, Deliverance resurfaced in 2000 and began recording their sixth studio album, Assimilation, which was released in the following year. Assimilation represented another change in style with a shift towards a more electronic/industrial sound. Deliverance again retreated until 2006.

In 2006, Deliverance reformed with a lineup of Jimmy P. Brown II, Mike Phillips, Corin Jae Scott, Tim Kronyak, and Mike Reed. The band's seventh studio album, As Above - So Below, was released on April 24, 2007. Full length songs from the album can currently be heard on the band's official MySpace page. The album featured a mix of all their past material (musically) with some more modern metal elements.

Deliverance announced they would be releasing a new album sometime in 2010 called The Annals of Subterfuge. This would mark Deliverance's 25th Anniversary. Though rumors persist of reuniting with past members, it became apparent that Jimmy would be recording the upcoming album with Mike Phillips.

Though the group officially disbanded in 1996, there have been fan demands for concert performances and new albums which caused the intermittent reunions every 4–5 years. Jimmy P. Brown II has spent the past 10 years working in the casino industry in Las Vegas, but currently resides in Alabama continuing his career with the casino industry. Jimmy has been quoted as saying: "I moved to Alabama to be close with my family, and to try regain normalcy for my family. Having lived in the fantasy land of Las Vegas for the past 10 years, I wanted to stay in the casino biz, but didn't want my kids growing up the Vegas way".

In 2010, Deliverance played the only show without Jimmy P. Brown II at NordicFest.

Third breakup and another reunion (2011–present)
On May 20, 2011 Mike Phillips announced that Deliverance was finally coming to end and would be performing their final show in August 2011. However, by July 2012, Deliverance had resurfaced again and been working on their tenth studio album Hear What I Say!, which was released on September 3, 2013 on Roxx Records and was planned as their final album. However, Jimmy Brown had later stated that Hear What I Say! would most likely not be their final album.

Though Brown stated that Hear What I Say! would be the last album, he announced that Deliverance would release new material in 2016. The band, whose lineup consists of former guitarist George Ochoa, former drummer Jim Chaffin and bassist Victor Máciás, played Exodo Fest in Mexico with Silent Planet and Grave Robber. In 2017, the self-titled album was re-released on vinyl through Roxx, and Weapons of Our Warfare was re-released through Bombworks Records. Later on in the year, it was announced that guitarist Glenn Rogers had returned to the band and that Ochoa had departed. It was also stated that Greg Minier (The Crucified) would record solos on the album. On September 28, 2017, it was announced that Deliverance had signed to Roxx Records and 3 Frogz Records, who released the band's eleventh studio album, The Subversive Kind, in early 2018. On October 28, 2017, the band released their debut single off of the album, "The Black Hand", accompanied with a lyric video. On February 20, 2020, the band announced the departure of longtime bassist Victor Macias and that Manny Morales would take the place of bassist again.

Outside Deliverance
After Deliverance, Jimmy Brown started to work on a new project, electronica-industrial-gothic group Fearful Symmetry. The name is taken from the poem "The Tyger" by William Blake. The group has published two albums, This Sad Veil of Tears in 2002 and A Loss of Balance in 2005.

Also in 2005, Jimmy formed an outfit called Jupiter VI along with Brian Khairullah, Trevor Shannon, Mike Reed and Tiberius Ahan. This band provided an outlet for Jimmy to express his love for glam rock, cited influences from Bowie, T-Rex, DA, Iggy Pop and others from the genre. They released their debut album titled "Back From Mars" in 2006 which was followed by "Moveable Walls" in 2014.

Brian Khairullah, former bass guitarist, has since renounced his faith and has unflattering things to say about religion.

Discography

Studio albums
 Deliverance (1989, Intense Records)
 Weapons of Our Warfare (1990, Intense Records)
 What a Joke (1991, Intense Records)
 Stay of Execution (1992, Intense Records)
 Learn (1993, Intense Records)
 River Disturbance (1994, Brainstorm Artists, Intl)
 Camelot in Smithereens (1995, Intense Records)
 Assimilation (2001, Indie Dream Records)
 As Above - So Below (2007, Retroactive Records)
 Hear What I Say! (2013, Roxx Records)
 The Subversive Kind (2018, Roxx Records)
 Camelot in Smithereens Deluxe ReDux (2022, Retroactive)

Other albums
 Intense Records Presents: Recorded Live, Vol. 1 (1992, Intense Records)
 A Decade of Deliverance compilation (1994, Intense Records)
 Back In the Day: The First Four Years compilation (2000, Magdalene Records) reissued in 2007 as The First Four Years
 Greetings of Death, etc. compilation (2001, Magdalene Records) (2007, Retroactive Records)
 Live at Cornerstone 2001 (2001, Magdalene Records)

Other releases
 Hot Metal Summer II Sex, Drugs & Rock n' Roll (1989, compilation on Frontline Records)
 Hot Metal Summer III Hot Licks - Cold Facts (1990, compilation on Intense Records)
 Hot Metal Summer 4 The Video (1991, VHS video Intense Records)
I Predict a Clone: A Steve Taylor Tribute (1994, tribute to Steve Taylor)
 Metal from the Dragon (Vol. 2) (2017, compilation on The Bearded Dragon Productions)

Members

Timeline

References

Works cited

External links
 
 
 No Life Til Metal's Deliverance Page
 Deliverance at Firestream.net
 Music Video for Weapons of Our Warfare at YouTube

American Christian metal musical groups
Christian extreme metal groups
Christian rock groups from California
Musical groups established in 1985
Musical groups disestablished in 1995
Musical groups reestablished in 2001
Musical groups disestablished in 2002
Musical groups reestablished in 2006
Musical quintets
American speed metal musical groups
Thrash metal musical groups from California
1985 establishments in California